Westhoff Independent School District is a public school district based in the community of Westhoff, Texas (USA).

The district operates one school serving grades PK-8.

The school was founded in 1908 (at a time when the community was called "Bello").  In 1950 the Lindenau and Wallis Ranch schools were consolidated into the Westhoff Rural School District as a result of state law passed; in 1978 the district became an independent district.

In 2009, the school district was rated "recognized" by the Texas Education Agency.

References

External links
 

School districts in DeWitt County, Texas